Buzova may refer to:

 Olga Buzova, Russian television personality, model, and singer
 Buzova, Kyiv Oblast, village in the Bucha Raion, Kyiv Oblast, Ukraine